Summoning, is the act of calling or summoning a spirit, demon, deity or other supernatural agent, in the Western mystery tradition.

Summoning or The Summoning may also refer to:

Books
 The Summoning (novel), a 2008 Darkest Powers novel by Kelley Armstrong
 The Summoning, a 1993 novel by Bentley Little
 The Summoning, a 2001 novel by Troy Denning

Film and television
 "The Summoning" (Babylon 5), an episode of Babylon 5
 The Summoning, the UK release name of the 2016 film more widely known as Planetarium
 The Summoning, a 2017 animation short aired as part of Go! Cartoons
 The Summoning (film), a 2018 Sri Lankan horror short film

Music
 Summoning (band), an Austrian black metal band
 The Summoning (album), a 2011 album by Glamour of the Kill
 "The Summoning", a spoken-word segment by Twilight Force from the album Tales of Ancient Prophecies
 "The Summoning", a song by Linkin Park from The Hunting Party
 "The Summoning", a song by Sleep Token from Take Me Back to Eden

Video gaming
 The Summoning (video game), a 1992 isometric-view fantasy role-playing game
 Summoning, a game mechanic in the Final Fantasy video game series

See also
 Summoner (disambiguation)
 Summons (disambiguation)